The Eurovision Young Musicians 1982 was the first edition of the Eurovision Young Musicians, a biennial event inspired by the success of the BBC Young Musician of the Year. The contest took place at the Free Trade Hall in Manchester, United Kingdom on 11 May 1982, and was organised by the European Broadcasting Union (EBU) and host broadcaster the British Broadcasting Corporation (BBC). Musicians from six participating countries took part in début contest, which was televised across the Eurovision Network. Humphrey Burton was the host of the contest and welcomed all of the participants in English, French, and German.

Each of the six participating countries sent either a male or female artist who was no older than 19 years of age, to represent them by playing an instrumental and a musical piece of their choice, and were accompanied by the BBC Northern Symphony Orchestra, under the conductor leadership of Bryden Thomson. The winner received a cash prize of £1,000.

Germany's Markus Pawlik won the contest, with France and Switzerland placing second and third respectively.  It was also notable that Germany won the Eurovision Song Contest 1982 just a few weeks earlier - also in England, and also by performing last in the running order.

History

The Eurovision Young Musicians, inspired by the success of the BBC Young Musician of the Year, is a biennial competition organised by the European Broadcasting Union (EBU) for European musicians that are 18 years old or younger.  Some participating countries held national heats in order to select their representatives for the contest. The first edition of the Eurovision Young Musicians took place in Manchester, United Kingdom on 11 May 1982 and six countries took part.

The BBC Young Musician of the Year is a televised national music competition. Broadcast originally on BBC Two biennially, and then on BBC Four years later. Despite the name, and hosted by the British Broadcasting Corporation (BBC), the competition, a former member of European Union of Music Competitions for Youth, is designed for British percussion, keyboard, string, brass and woodwind players, all of whom must be eighteen years of age or under on 1 January in the relevant year.

The competition was established in 1978 by Humphrey Burton and Walter Todds, both of whom are former members of the BBC Television Music Department. Michael Hext, a trombonist, was the inaugural winner. In 1994, the usage of percussion instruments was first permitted, alongside the existing keyboard, string, brass and woodwind categories. The competition has five stages, which consist of regional auditions, category auditions, category finals, semi-finals and the final.

Location

The Free Trade Hall in Peter Street, Manchester, England, was the host venue for the first edition of the Eurovision Young Musicians. The Italian palazzo-style hall was built on a trapeziform site in ashlar sandstone. It has a two-storey, nine-bay facade and concealed roof. On Peter Street, its ground floor arcade has rectangular piers with round-headed arches and spandrels bearing the coats of arms of Lancashire towns that took part in the Anti-Corn Law movement. The upper floor has a colonnaded arcade, its tympana frieze is richly decorated with carved figures representing free trade, the arts, commerce, manufacture and the continents. Above the tympanum is a prominent cornice with balustraded parapet. The upper floor has paired Ionic columns to each bay and a tall window with a pedimented architrave behind a balustraded balcony. The return sides have three bays in a matching but simpler style of blank arches. The rear wall was rebuilt in 1950–51 with pilasters surmounted by relief figures representing the entertainment which took place in the old hall. The Large Hall was in a classical style with a coffered ceiling, the walls had wood panelling in oak, walnut and sycamore.
Pevsner described it as "the noblest monument in the Cinquecento style in England", whilst Hartwell considered it "a classic which belongs in the canon of historic English architecture."

Format

Humphrey Burton was the host of the inaugural contest, and welcomed representatives from six participating countries in English, French, and German. Each participating country were able to send male or female artists who were no older than 19 years of age, to represent them by playing an instrumental and a musical piece of their choice. They were all accompanied by the BBC Northern Symphony Orchestra, which was conducted by Bryden Thomson. The winner received a cash prize of £1,000.

Results
Awards were given to the top three countries. The table below highlights these using gold, silver, and bronze. The placing results of the remaining participants is unknown and never made public by the European Broadcasting Union.

Jury members
The jury members consisted of the following:

  – Miguel Ángel Estrella
  – Gerhard Wimberger
  – Jean-Claude Casadesus
  – Hans Heinz Stuckenschmidt
 / – Mischa Maisky
  – Argeo Quadri (head juror)
  – Frans Vester
  – Gunnar Rugstad
  – Eric Tappy
  – Alun Hoddinott
  – Carole Dawn Reinhart

Broadcasting
EBU members from the following countries broadcast the contest.

See also
 Eurovision Song Contest 1982

Notes and references

Notes

References

External links 
 

Eurovision Young Musicians by year
1982 in music
1982 in British music
1982 in the United Kingdom
Music in Manchester
Events in Manchester
May 1982 events in the United Kingdom